Mucin-20 is a protein that in humans is encoded by the MUC20 gene.

References

Further reading

20